Several Canadian naval units have been named HMCS Quebec.

She was reactivated by the RCN from 1952 to 1956 and renamed HMCS Quebec.
CSTC HMCS Quebec (II) was a cadet summer training centre of the Royal Canadian Sea Cadets which carried the unit name until 2012.
 HMCS Quebec was a planned Canada-class submarine cancelled in 1989

References

 Government of Canada Ships' Histories - HMCS Quebec

See also
 
 , Royal Navy ships and bases of the name
 

Royal Canadian Navy ship names